Elmer Edwin "Rob-Rob" Robinson (October 3, 1894 – June 9, 1982) was the 33rd mayor of San Francisco, California. A Republican, he served as San Francisco's mayor from January 1948 until January 1956.

Robinson was born in the Richmond District of San Francisco, but primarily grew up in the northern California town of Fort Bragg. He moved back to San Francisco to attend night law school, after which he was admitted to the bar in 1915. He served as a deputy district attorney of San Francisco County, 1915 to 1921. He worked for 15 years, as a civil and criminal attorney in private practice.

In 1933, President Roosevelt appointed Robinson to direct adjustment of claims of World War I veterans, at the request of the Disabled American Veterans. In January 1935, he became a Municipal Court judge, and that October a Superior Court judge. He was elected to two six-year terms on the San Francisco County Superior bench, 1936 and 1942. During World War II, he was the California State Chairman of a national salvage committee.

Robinson was elected mayor of San Francisco in November 1947, taking office the following January and reelected for another four years in 1951. He promoted and oversaw numerous development projects, including an expansion of San Francisco International Airport and the construction of new schools, libraries, police stations, parking garages, and the modernization of the San Francisco Municipal Railway. San Francisco, although relatively prosperous in the boom years after World War II, experienced some population loss to outlying suburban areas during Robinson's terms in office. By 1955 it was estimated the city had a population of over 800,000 people and a budget of over $200 million.

From 1953 through 1955, Robinson served as president of the United States Conference of Mayors.

Robinson returned to his law practice and served as president and general manager of Woodlawn Memorial Park, living in San Francisco before dying in Paradise on June 8, 1982, aged 87.

References

External links
Found San Francisco link on Robinson
Robinson papers with bio

1894 births
1982 deaths
Mayors of San Francisco
California lawyers
People from Fort Bragg, California
California Republicans
20th-century American politicians
Presidents of the United States Conference of Mayors
20th-century American lawyers
20th-century American Episcopalians
Burials at Woodlawn Memorial Park Cemetery (Colma, California)